Glasshoughton is a neighbourhood of Castleford in West Yorkshire, England, that borders on Pontefract. The appropriate Wakefield ward is called Castleford Central and Glasshoughton. It is home to the Xscape leisure centre and ski slope, the Junction 32 Outlet Shopping Village, a B&Q, a hotel, several pubs and a number of fast food restaurants, which were built on the site of the former Glasshoughton Colliery and coke coking plant. This area also contains the Glasshoughton Wheel of Light, a former pit winding wheel now made into a sculpture as a memorial to the miners of Glasshoughton.

The area is next to Junction 32 of the M62 motorway and the Glasshoughton railway station.

There are several pubs, takeaways, a parade of shops, and a Asda superstore. Next to Asda, on part of the colliery site, is the Castleford Campus of Wakefield College.

The local football team is Glasshoughton Welfare F.C., for whom former Liverpool F.C. goalkeeper, Bruce Grobbelaar made one fund-raising appearance in 2007.

History
For most of the nineteenth century Glasshoughton was a separate village with an economic, social and religious life of its own. It had glassworks before Castleford and it supplied most of the coal for Castleford's industries until the big, modern pits opened at Wheldale, Fryston and Glasshoughton itself from the late 1860s. There was a Wesleyan chapel in the village from not much later than 1837, this being the year a plot of land on what is now School Lane was sold for "a Methodist Chapel and Sunday School". In the 1851 census the village name was sometimes spelled Glashouton. In the 1870s, the locale was well known as Houghton-Glass for its mines and quarries, producing excellent limestone and excellent sand used by glassmakers and iron foundries. The 1890 Ordnance Survey map shows Glass Houghton as a village distinct from Castleford, with its largest buildings along each side of Front Street. The population growth of Castleford to the southwest of the old village centre naturally has been referred to as Glasshoughton.

The major impacts on the budding community in the twentieth century were related to growing prosperity due to the impact of technological innovation. Efficiencies in communications led to the growth and political consolidation of the surrounding communities. The vehicular bypass named Colorado Way was realised.

Glasshoughton railway station on the Pontefract Line was opened on 21 February 2005, especially to serve the newly built leisure and retail facilities. The station has allowed growth in "park and ride" and "walk and ride" commuters, thereby reducing local and regional road congestion, decreasing commute times.

References

Geography of the City of Wakefield
Castleford